Vasilina Vasilyevna Kuliyeva (née Zakharchenko, born 20 November 1981) is a Russian politician of the Liberal Democratic Party, who was a member of the State Duma between 2011 and 2012, and 2016 and 2021.

Biography 
In 2004, she graduated from the N. G. Chernyshevsky Transbaikal Pedagogical University, with a degree in jurisprudence. From 2005 to 2008 she worked in the Chita branch of Spasskie Vorota insurance group as a lawyer, in parallel, she was the deputy coordinator of the Chita regional branch of the Liberal Democratic Party of Russia.

From 2008 to 2011, she worked as an employee of the Governor's staff of Zabaykalsky Krai, at the same time was an assistant to the member of the 5th State Duma from LDPR. In 2009, she came second in the mayoral election in Chita. In December 2011 she elected memder of the 6th State Duma on the list of the Liberal Democratic Party, entering the Committee on family, women and children and Commission on parliamentary ethics. She resigned as deputy on 17 December 2012 to run for 2013 gubernatorial elections. As LDPR candidate for the Governor of Zabaykalsky Krai she took third place with 10% of the vote. In the elections to the 7th State Duma, she ran for the Liberal Democrats in Dauria constituency No. 44, and was elected on 18 September 2016.

In the elections to the 8th State Duma Kulieva was running in the same Dauria constituency, but unlike the previous campaign ruling United Russia party also decided to nominate the candidate for this seat. As a result, Kuliyeva came only 4th in the race, after Yury Grigoryev from SRZP, Yekaterina Fisun from United Russia and Communist Dmitry Nosov.

See also 
 Results of the 2016 Russian legislative election by constituency
 List of members of the 7th Russian State Duma

References 

Living people
1981 births
Sixth convocation members of the State Duma (Russian Federation)
Seventh convocation members of the State Duma (Russian Federation)
People from Chita, Zabaykalsky Krai
21st-century Russian women politicians
Liberal Democratic Party of Russia politicians